Xerias may refer to:

Xerias (Argolis), a river of Argolis, Greece
Xerias (Euboea), a river of Euboea, Greece
Xerias, former name of Titarisios, a river of Thessaly, Greece